The 2015 Kjærgaard Danish FIM Speedway Grand Prix was the seventh race of the 2015 Speedway Grand Prix season. It took place on August 8 at the CASA Arena in Horsens, Denmark.

Riders 
First reserve Peter Kildemand replaced Jarosław Hampel, who had injured himself during the 2015 Speedway World Cup. The Speedway Grand Prix Commission also nominated Mikkel Michelsen as the wild card, and Nikolaj Busk Jakobsen and Anders Thomsen both as Track Reserves.

Results 
The Grand Prix was won by Peter Kildemand, who beat Matej Žagar, Michael Jepsen Jensen and Tai Woffinden in the final. Maciej Janowski had initially top scored with 12 points during the qualifying rides, however he was eliminated in the semi-finals. After finishing fourth, Woffinden extended his overall lead over Nicki Pedersen to 13 points in the race for the world title.

Heat details

The intermediate classification

References

See also 
 motorcycle speedway

2015 Speedway Grand Prix
2015 in Danish motorsport
Speedway Grand Prix of Denmark